Western Cyclone is a 1943 American Producers Releasing Corporation Western film of the "Billy the Kid" series directed by Sam Newfield.  The film is also known as Frontier Fighters (cut American reissue title).

Plot 
On a western land, a governor's daughter (Marjorie Manners) is kidnapped and held hostage. Billy the Kid (Buster Crabbe) and Fuzzy Q, Jones (Al St. John) try to rescue her and capture a lot of men known to work for the kidnapper and hold them for questioning. While out on the ranch, Billy and Fuzzy spot a cowboy (Kermit Maynard) who happens to be a henchman with a letter about the kidnapped girl. He refuses to tell who gave him the letter so Billy decides just to find the girl on his own and leaves Fuzzy in charge of tying up the henchman and put him with the rest. Fuzzy tells the henchman to pick up a gun on the floor and when he bends down Fuzzy kicks him and knocks him out. While Billy is looking for the girl, Fuzzy ties up the henchman and takes his boots and socks off to perform an Indian fire torture on the soles of his feet in effort to make him talk, but the man still refuses to tell him who gave him the letter and Fuzzy can't bring himself to burn the henchman. While trying to light a cigar, Fuzzy strokes a match down the sole of the man's foot causing him to burst with laughter. Having found out the henchman was ticklish, Fuzzy grabs his feet and ask him to tell him who gave him the letter. The man once again refuses so Fuzzy begins tickle torturing his bare feet. Fuzzy asked him again and the man still refuses to talk, but the more he refused the more Fuzzy would mercilessly keep tickling the soles of his feet. After enduring brutal tickling on his feet, the henchman can't take anymore and confesses. Fuzzy then tells his friends how the henchman was so ticklish that he got him to talk. Now knowing who send the letter the guys all go to try to rescue the kidnapped girl.

Cast 
Buster Crabbe as Billy the Kid
Al St. John as Fuzzy Q, Jones
Marjorie Manners as Mary Arnold
Karl Hackett as Governor Jim Arnold
Milton Kibbee as Senator Peabody
Glenn Strange as Dirk Randall
Charles King as Ace Harmon
Hal Price as Sheriff Hastings
Kermit Maynard as Ticklish henchman Hank
Jack Ingram as Rufe Meeker

See also
The "Billy the Kid" films starring Buster Crabbe: 
 Billy the Kid Wanted (1941)
 Billy the Kid's Round-Up (1941)
 Billy the Kid Trapped (1942)
 Billy the Kid's Smoking Guns (1942)
 Law and Order (1942) 
 Sheriff of Sage Valley (1942) 
 The Mysterious Rider (1942)
 The Kid Rides Again (1943)
 Fugitive of the Plains (1943)
 Western Cyclone (1943)
 Cattle Stampede (1943)
 The Renegade (1943)
 Blazing Frontier (1943)
 Devil Riders (1943)
 Frontier Outlaws (1944)
 Valley of Vengeance (1944)
 The Drifter (1944) 
 Fuzzy Settles Down (1944)
 Rustlers' Hideout (1944)
 Wild Horse Phantom (1944)
 Oath of Vengeance (1944)
 His Brother's Ghost (1945) 
 Thundering Gunslingers (1945)
 Shadows of Death (1945)
 Gangster's Den (1945)
 Stagecoach Outlaws (1945)
 Border Badmen (1945)
 Fighting Bill Carson (1945)
 Prairie Rustlers (1945) 
 Lightning Raiders (1945)
 Terrors on Horseback (1946)
 Gentlemen with Guns (1946)
 Ghost of Hidden Valley (1946)
 Prairie Badmen (1946)
 Overland Riders (1946)
 Outlaws of the Plains (1946)

External links 

1943 films
1943 Western (genre) films
American black-and-white films
Billy the Kid (film series)
Films directed by Sam Newfield
American Western (genre) films
1940s English-language films
1940s American films